Amanda Michelle Jackson (born June 27, 1985) is an American-Armenian female basketball player. Jackson played college basketball for the Miami Redhawks at Miami University. She led the Redhawks to their first NCAA tournament and as of 2016, ranks second as their all-time leading scorer. She was inducted into the Springfield City School District Athletic Hall of Fame in 2018.

Miami (Ohio) statistics

Source

Professional career
After college, Jackson signed with the Chicago Sky's on a WNBA training camp contract but failed to yield a professional contract. She then turned to play basketball internationally.

References

External links
 Profile at eurobasket.com

1985 births
Living people
Sportspeople from Springfield, Ohio
American women's basketball players
Armenian women's basketball players
Armenian people of African-American descent
Shooting guards